Jeff Lima is an American actor. He is best known for his recurring role as Leon Cruz on Chicago Fire.

Early life 
Jeff Lima was born in the Spanish Harlem neighborhood of New York City to a Puerto Rican family. At the age of 11, Lima began taking acting classes and merited a spot in a premiere New York City performing arts high school. 
While attending high school, he auditioned for a film in which he met Golden Globe winner Gina Rodriguez who introduced him to her agent, at the time, and he would later proceed to sign with them.

Career 
Lima landed his television debut on Guiding Light as Byron, opposite Jeff Branson and Gina Tognoni. He has appeared in numerous films including Stealing Cars, released in 2015. Lima has guest starred in CBS's Blue Bloods and NBC's Taxi Brooklyn. He was a series regular in the HBO American Miniseries Show Me a Hero. Jeff Lima also appeared in The Bobby Brown Story as Angel in the 2018 BET Network series. Notably, he appears as Leon Cruz in NBC's Chicago Fire.

Jeff Lima partnered with New York University Tisch School of the Arts to support the Film Program of the Maurice Kanbar Institute of Film and Television Graduate Division, by granting The Jeff Lima Production Award of $10,000 to be bestowed upon one directing student enrolled in the Graduate Film Program whose film project advances the Latinx presence on screen. The grant is in its second year with a recipient to be announced every spring.

Filmography

Film

Television

References

Living people
American male film actors
American male television actors
Year of birth missing (living people)